Alison Wray (born 1960) FAcSS is a Research Professor in  Language and Communication at Cardiff University in the United Kingdom. She is known for her work on formulaic language.

Career 
Wray has been teaching at Cardiff University since 1999. She has also taught at Swansea University, York St John University, University College of Ripon and York St John. Her BA (1983) and D.Phil. (1988) degrees (both in Linguistics) are from the University of York.

Besides her work on formulaic language, Wray is interested in language profiling, evolution of language and psycholinguistic theory. She also investigates language patterns in people with dementia. Her book, The Dynamics of Dementia Communication (Wray 2020) won the 2021 Book Prize of the British Association for Applied Linguistics and was runner up in the American Association for Applied Linguistics Book Award 2021-22.

Bibliography 
Formulaic Language: Pushing the Boundaries (2008)
Formulaic Language and the Lexicon (2002)
Wray, Alison (ed.) (2002). Transition to Language. Oxford University Press UK.
The Dynamics of Dementia Communication (2020) Oxford University Press.

References

External links 
 Alison Wray's homepage: http://cardiff.ac.uk/encap/contactsandpeople/profiles/wray-alison.html
Understanding the Challenges of Dementia Communication (Youtube video)
Dementia - The "Communication Disease" (Youtube video)

Living people
Applied linguists
Women linguists
Linguists from the United Kingdom
Linguists from Wales
Academics of Cardiff University
Fellows of the Academy of Social Sciences
Alumni of the University of York
1960 births